John P. Perdew (born August 30, 1943) is a theoretical condensed matter physicist known for his contributions to the fields of solid-state physics and quantum chemistry. His work on density functional theory has led to him being one of the world's most cited physicists. Perdew currently teaches and conducts research at Temple University.

Early life and education
John Perdew was born and raised in Cumberland, Maryland. After showing an aptitude for mathematics in high school, Perdew received a National Merit Scholarship and attended Gettysburg College, where he developed his interest in physics.

Perdew graduated Summa cum laude from Gettysburg College with a Bachelor of Arts in physics in 1965. He then received a Ph.D. in physics from Cornell University in 1971. His doctoral advisor was John W. Wilkins, who introduced Perdew to solid-state theory.

Academic career
Perdew began his academic career as a postdoctoral fellow under Sy Vosko at the University of Toronto from 1971–74, and then with David Langreth at Rutgers University from 1975-77.

Perdew started his teaching career in 1977 at Tulane University, where he taught until 2013. During his time at Tulane, Perdew taught physics and supervised nine completed Ph.D.’s as well as 11 postdoctoral fellows. He received the Outstanding Researcher Award from Tulane's School of Science and Engineering in 2007 and the President's Awards for Excellence in Professional and Graduate Teaching in 2009.

In 2013, Perdew moved to Temple University, where he is a Laura H. Carnell Professor of Physics and Chemistry at Temple's School of Science and Technology, as well as the founding director of the Center for Materials Theory.

Work in density functional theory
John Perdew's best-known scientific contributions are in the field of density functional theory (DFT). He was introduced to DFT by his postdoctoral supervisors at University of Toronto and Rutgers, before it became widely used.

Perdew was one of the early pioneers of density functional theory, helping it become accurate enough for calculations in quantum chemistry, materials science, and geoscience. He made important contributions to the exact adiabatic connection formula for the exchange-correlation energy, the derivative discontinuity and its contribution to the fundamental gap, scaling and other exact constraints on the functionals, the self-interaction correction, the nonempirical generalized gradient approximation (GGA), and the nonempirical meta-GGA.

Visualizing DFT functionals to be a succession of ladder steps, Perdew formulated the Jacob's Ladder strategy for constructing improved density functionals for the exchange-correlation energy. Perdew first presented this theory at the International Congress of Quantum Chemistry's DFT2000 symposium in June 2000, describing five generations of functionals in a sequence he called the Jacob's Ladder. Perdew's Jacob's Ladder scheme has been picked up by other researchers in DFT and progress higher up the ladder continue to appear in the field's scientific literature.

Perdew continues DFT research in his role at Temple University. His current research interests include the construction of a better meta-GGA and improved descriptions for strong correlation and for the van der Waals interaction.

Impact on field
John Perdew is one of the world's most cited physicists, with over 340,000 Google Scholar citations referring to his work in the field of density functional theory. A study identifies him as possibly the world's most-cited physicist for articles published between 1981 and 2010. Of Perdew's more than 260 published works, a 1996 paper titled "Generalized Gradient Approximation Made Simple" from the journal Physical Review Letters has been cited more than 147,000 times and was the most-cited paper in the field of physics from 1996-2010. In total, Perdew has five works among the 10 most-cited physics papers of the past 30 years.

Many of Perdew's peers recognize his influence on the field of density functional theory. He was elected to the National Academy of Sciences (USA) in 2011. Upon naming Perdew as the recipient of the 2012 Materials Theory Award, the Materials Research Society cited Perdew's “pioneering contributions” that resulted in thousands of other researchers being able to perform DFT calculations and simulations.

Honors and awards

John Perdew was elected to the National Academy of Sciences in 2011, and is one of 2,000 distinguished scientists from all fields that help advise the U.S. government on scientific policy. Other notable awards and honors include:

 2003 Elected to the International Academy of Quantum Molecular Science
 2007 Outstanding Researcher Award from Tulane's School of Science and Engineering
 2009 April issue of Journal of Chemical Theory and Computation dedicated to Perdew in honor of his 65th birthday
 2009 Tulane University President's Awards for Excellence in Professional and Graduate Teaching
 2012 Received Materials Theory Award from the Materials Research Society
 2015 Alexander von Humboldt Professorship
 2015 Doctor Honoris Causa, Budapest University of Technology and Economics
 2015 John Scott Medal

References

External links

 John Perdew at Temple University Department of Physics
 Temple University Center for Materials Theory
 John Perdew at National Academy of Sciences
arXiv.org preprints for J. Perdew
search on author John Perdew from Google Scholar

Living people
1943 births
21st-century American physicists
Gettysburg College alumni
Cornell University alumni
Tulane University faculty
Temple University faculty
Members of the United States National Academy of Sciences
People from Cumberland, Maryland
Members of the International Academy of Quantum Molecular Science